The Abbe Museum is a museum with two locations in Bar Harbor, Maine, on Mount Desert Island.  The museum is dedicated to exploring the history and culture of Maine's Native people, the Wabanaki.  It has one location at 26 Mount Desert Street in the center of Bar Harbor, and a second location at Sieur de Monts in Acadia National Park.  The Sieur de Monts building is an architecturally distinctive structure, listed on the National Register of Historic Places as one of the state's first purpose-built museum buildings, and as a rare example in the state of Mediterranean architecture.

The museum was formerly led by CEO Cinnamon Catlin-Legutko, who has been an advocate for decolonizing museums.  In 2020, the Abbe board of trustees hired Passamaquoddy tribal citizen Chris Newell to lead the museum under the dual role of Executive Director and Sr. Partner to Wabanaki Nations.

Collections
The museum collections include a large number of artifacts fashioned during prehistoric and historic times by Native Americans and by Europeans who began arriving in the area in the early 17th century.  Stone artifacts include projectile (arrow and spear) points; bone artifacts include harpoons, hooks, combs, and a rare flute that may be as much as 2,000 years old.  Also included are large number of baskets, and a powder horn attributed to the Penobscot chief Orono.  The core of the collection was made the pioneering radiologist Robert Abbe, who retired to Mount Desert Island after becoming enfeebled by the long-term effects of radiation exposure.

Architecture
The Sieur de Monts building was designed by Edmund M. Gilchrist, and was completed in 1928.  Stylistically it has elements of both the Spanish Colonial Revival and the Italian Renaissance, and has a unique octagonal space specifically designed in consultation with Dr. Abbe to house his collections.  It is believed to be the only non-domestic example of Mediterranean architecture in the state, and was its first purpose-built museum building.

See also
National Register of Historic Places listings in Hancock County, Maine
National Register of Historic Places listings in Acadia National Park

References

External links

Abbe Museum web site

Buildings and structures completed in 1928
Museums in Hancock County, Maine
Buildings and structures in Bar Harbor, Maine
Native American museums in Maine
National Register of Historic Places in Acadia National Park
1928 establishments in Maine
National Register of Historic Places in Hancock County, Maine